Sean Patrick Adams is an American academic and author. He is the Hyatt and Cici Brown Professor of History at the University of Florida. He specializes in the history of American capitalism and energy.

Books

Author
Home Fires: How Americans Kept Warm in the 19th Century (Johns Hopkins University Press, 2014)
Old Dominion, Industrial Commonwealth: Coal, Politics, and Economy in Antebellum America (Johns Hopkins University Press, 2004)
The American Coal Industry, 1789-1902 (2013)

Editor
A Companion to the Era of Andrew Jackson (2013) 
The Early American Republic: A Documentary History (2009)

References

American non-fiction writers
University of Florida faculty
Living people
Year of birth missing (living people)